The 1997 Dubai World Cup was a horse race held at Nad Al Sheba Racecourse on Thursday 3 April 1997. It was the 2nd running of the Dubai World Cup.

The winner was Sheikh Mohammed's Singspiel, a five-year-old bay horse trained in the United Kingdom by Michael Stoute and ridden by Jerry Bailey. Bailey had won the inaugural running of the race on Cigar in 1996.

Singspiel was an established international performer at the highest level, having won the Canadian International Stakes and the Japan Cup in 1996, but had never previously competed on dirt. In the 1997 Dubai World Cup Singspiel took the lead approaching the final furlong and won by one and a quarter lengths and one and a half length from Siphon and Sandpit, two Brazilian-bred horses trained in the United States by Richard Mandella. The Japanese mare Hokuto Vega was fatally injured in a fall approaching the straight, bringing down the British colt Bijou d'Inde.

Race details
 Sponsor: none
 Purse: £2,380,852; First prize: £1,428,471
 Surface: Dirt
 Going: Fast
 Distance: 10 furlongs
 Number of runners: 12
 Winner's time: 2:01.91

Full result
{| class = "sortable" | border="1" cellpadding="0" style="border-collapse: collapse;"
|-  style="background:#7d7; text-align:center;"
! style="width:35px;"| Pos.
! style="width:45px;"| Marg.
! style="width:160px;"| Horse (bred)
! style="width:30px;"| Age
! style="width:160px;"| Jockey
! style="width:210px;"| Trainer (Country)
|-
| 1
| 
| Singspiel (IRE)
| 5
| Jerry Bailey
| Michael Stoute (GB)
|-
| 2
| 1¼
| Siphon (BRZ)
| 6
| David Flores
| Richard Mandella (USA)
|-
| 3
| ''1½| Sandpit (BRZ)
| 8
| Corey Nakatani
| Richard Mandella (USA)
|-
| 4| 2½
| Key of Luck (USA)
| 6
| J. C. Arias
| Kiaran McLaughlin (USA)
|-
| 5| 1½
| Formal Gold (CAN)
| 4
| Joe Bravo
| W. Perry (USA)
|-
| 6| 2½
| Juggler (AUS)
| 6
| Glen Boss
| Gai Waterhouse (AUS)
|-
| 7| 2½
| Even Top (IRE)
| 4
| Richard Hills
| Mark Tompkins (GB)
|-
| 8| 
| Lammtarra (USA)
| 4
| Frankie Dettori
| Saeed bin Suroor (GB/UAE)
|-
| 9| 2½
| Luso (GB)
| 5
| Mick Kinane
| Clive Brittain (GB)
|-
| 10| nk
| Flemensfirth (USA)
| 5
| Gary Hind
| John Gosden (GB)
|-
| Fell| 
| Hokuto Vega (JPN)
| 7
| Norihiro Yokoyama
| Takao Nakano (JPN)
|-
| BD| 
| Bijou d'Inde (GB)
| 4
| Jason Weaver
| Mark Johnston (GB)
|}
 Abbreviations: DSQ = disqualified; nse = nose; nk = neck; shd = head; hd = head; nk = neck; dist = distance; BD = brought down

Winner's details
Further details of the winner, Singspiel
 Sex: Stallion
 Foaled: 25 February 1992
 Country: Ireland
 Sire: In The Wings; Dam: Glorious Song (Halo)
 Owner: Sheikh Mohammed
 Breeder:''' Sheikh Mohammed

References

Dubai World Cup
1997 in horse racing
1997 in Emirati sport
Dubai World Cup